is a city located in Nagano Prefecture, Japan. , the city had an estimated population of 32,210 in 12937 households, and a population density of 190 persons per km².

Geography
Komagane is located in a north-south valley of the Tenryu River between the Central and Southern Alps in south-central Nagano Prefecture at an average elevation of 676 meters. It is situated at the 220 km marker on the southern (Nagoya) branch of the Chūō Expressway,

Surrounding municipalities
Nagano Prefecture
 Ina
 Iijima
 Nakagawa
 Miyada
 Agematsu
 Ōkuwa
 Ōshika

Climate
The city has a climate characterized by characterized by hot and humid summers, and relatively mild winters (Köppen climate classification Cfa).  The average annual temperature in Komagane is 11.7 °C. The average annual rainfall is 1486 mm with September as the wettest month. The temperatures are highest on average in August, at around 24.3 °C, and lowest in January, at around -0.4 °C.

Demographics
Per Japanese census data, the population of Komagane has remained relatively stable in recent decades.

History
The area of present-day Komagane was part of ancient Shinano Province. The city was founded on July 1, 1954 by the merger of the towns of Akaho and Miyata with the villages of Nakasawa and Ina (all from Kamiina District).

Government
Komagane has a mayor-council form of government with a directly elected mayor and a unicameral city legislature of 15 members.

Economy
The economy of Komagane is largely agricultural, with rice and pears, along with sake brewing as major components. The manufacturing sector includes electronics and precision instrumentation. Seasonal tourism is also an important contributor to the local economy.

Education
Komagane has five public elementary schools and two public middle schools operated by the city government. The city has two public high schools operated by the Nagano Prefectural Board of Education. The Nagano College of Nursing is located in Komagane.

Transportation

Railway
 Central Japan Railway Company - Iida Line
  -  -  -

Highway
  Chūō Expressway

International relations
 - Pokhara, Nepal, sister city since April 18, 2001

Local attractions
Despite relatively poor transportation infrastructure (there is no Shinkansen link and the existing railway is a single track local line), the city derives a large proportion of its overall income from tourism. The Silk Museum is situated to the east of the city, while on the western side of town the Komagatake Ropeway (gondola) ascends Mount Komagatake in the Central Alps. The city has several popular tourist hotels (including one on the mountain which is only accessible via the ropeway), a youth hostel, onsen and a ski resort.
Kōzen-ji, Buddhist temple with Japanese garden, one of the National Places of Scenic Beauty.

References

External links

Official Website 

 
Cities in Nagano Prefecture